Burgruine Eppenstein is a ruined medieval castle overlooking Eppenstein in the Austrian state of Styria. It was built about 1000 AD as the ancestral seat of the Eppenstein dynasty, whose members served as Margraves of Styria and were enfeoffed with the Duchy of Carinthia in the 11th and 12th century.

History 
The former spur castle is situated in the mountainous Upper Styria region, at a height of  aA. It stood above an important trade route running from the upper Mur valley across the Seetal Alps and Obdach Saddle down to the Carinthian Lavant valley.

The castrum was first mentioned in an 1160 deed, while the progenitors of the Bavarian Eppenstein family are documented as Styrian margraves since about 970. Margrave Adalbero was elevated as a Duke of Carinthia by King Henry II of Germany in 1012. When the Eppensteins became extinct upon the death of Duke Henry III of Carinthia in 1122, their allodial possessions were inherited by Margrave Ottokar II of Styria and his descendants.

Rebuilt and leased to Styrian ministeriales, the castle was seized by King Ottokar II of Bohemia who had campaigned the Styrian lands and ousted the Hungarian forces at the 1260 Battle of Kressenbrunn. After Ottokar was defeated by King Rudolf I of Germany and killed in the 1278 Battle on the Marchfeld, the fortress passed through many hands over the centuries. Later held by Habsburg ministeriales like the von Graben family, it was rebuilt in a Gothic style around 1478. Rebuilt in a Gothic style and conquered by the forces of King Matthias Corvinus during the Austrian–Hungarian War in 1482, it gradually lost importance and decayed.

See also
List of castles in Austria

References
This article was initially translated from the German Wikipedia.

Castles in Styria